Law enforcement in Australia is one of the three major components of the country's justice system, along with courts and corrections. Law enforcement officers are employed by all three levels of government – federal, state/territory, and local.

Federally, the primary law enforcement agency is the Australian Federal Police (AFP), which has a wide mandate to enforce Australian criminal law and protect its national interests. There is also a number of other agencies that have powers confined to specific areas, such as customs and immigration (Australian Border Force), and white-collar crime (Australian Taxation Office, Australian Competition & Consumer Commission, Australian Securities & Investments Commission). Each branch of the Australian Defence Force (ADF) has its own military police which operates under the Joint Military Police Unit (JMPU). The ADF Investigative Service also forms part of the JMPU and is the primary agency for complex investigations that fall under the Defence Force Discipline Act.

General law enforcement duties are generally the responsibility of state police forces, who are in turn responsible to a state government minister (usually a Minister for Police). These forces carry out uniformed policing throughout the entire state in which they operate. Other state government agencies may also have investigative or enforcement powers for specific offences within their purview, such as fisheries. The Northern Territory is the only Australian Territory with its own police force, but in Australia's other territories (including the Australian Capital Territory) law enforcement is handled by the Federal Government, specifically the Australian Federal Police. Local governments may also employ their authorised officers, commonly known as council rangers, to enforce local government by-laws or certain state laws pertaining solely to the local government jurisdiction in which they're employed. Council rangers do not have full police powers unless they are sworn as special constables.

State police officers and Australian Federal Police officers routinely carry firearms, other state and federal law enforcement officers may carry firearms or other items for personal defence depending on their agency or the condition in which they're deployed. While on duty, an armed law enforcement officer's duty belt generally consists of a handgun, Taser, expandable baton, pepper spray, a set of handcuffs, ammunition magazines, gloves, torch, and a two-way radio.

Federal

Australian Federal Police
The primary federal law enforcement agency in Australia is the Australian Federal Police. The AFP was created in 1979, having been the result of an amalgamation of the now-defunct Commonwealth Police and Australian Capital Territory Police Force. It is responsible for the investigation of federal offences (crimes against the Commonwealth), and has federal jurisdiction throughout Australia. It provides protective services to federal government properties, government personnel, dignitaries and foreign diplomatic officials, and major airports.  It also provides regular law enforcement within external Australian territories, the Australian Capital Territory and the Jervis Bay Territory. The boundaries between the two levels of law enforcement are somewhat flexible, and both state and federal police cooperate on or transfer cases between each other depending on the specific circumstances.

The AFP also conducts operations overseas.  These include providing liaison officers to various overseas posts to assist in relations with various police forces overseas, providing community policing to assist in the development of foreign law enforcement agencies, and contributing to peacekeeping operations such as the RAMSI Mission in the Solomon Islands and the UN Peacekeeping Force in Cyprus.

Australian Border Force

The Australian Border Force is responsible for customs and immigration enforcement and border protection at Australia's ports as well as in Australian waters, and conducts investigations where the AFP does not have primary jurisdiction. Unlike AFP Officers, Border Force Officers do not have fully vested federal police powers, and can only exercise arrest and detain powers at Airport and seaport jurisdictions. They may, however, detain persons for state or federal crimes or warrants until that person can be presented to a federal or state law enforcement officer with the appropriate powers. Australian Border Force officers have the authority to carry firearms when a supervisor approves. In practice, only maritime, specialist counter-terrorism officers and Investigators carry firearms.

Australian Fisheries Management Authority
The Australian Fisheries Management Authority (AFMA) provides fisheries enforcement in Australia's Exclusive Economic Zone, officers are authorised under the Fisheries Management Act 1991 to board and search vessels, and search vehicles and persons suspected of committing fisheries offences and may also search shore-based installation under a search warrant or in other specific circumstances. AFMA officers may with or without a warrant, arrest a person suspected of committing a fisheries offence or an offence against environmental law, and authorised to carry personal defense equipment.  Like the Australian Federal Police and Australian Border Force, AFMA is overseen by the Australian Commission for Law Enforcement Integrity.

Australian Tax Office
The Australian Tax Office (ATO) is a revenue service responsible for tax collection throughout Australia. The ATO is overseen by the Australian Commission for Law Enforcement Integrity (ACLI). ATO officers are provided limited law enforcement powers under the Excise Act 1901 and the Tax Administration Act 1953, AFP and ABF officers are also provided powers under these acts.

Australian Criminal Intelligence Commission
The Australian Criminal Intelligence Commission (ACIC) is a standing commission to provide criminal intelligence to Federal and State law enforcement agencies and assists in criminal investigations. ACIC is formed under the Australian Crime Commission Act, while the commission itself does not have full law enforcement powers, law enforcement officers from state and federal agency are routinely seconded to the ACIC to assist in its functions. Under the Australian Crime Commission Act ACIC members have a number of coercive powers to gather criminal intelligence. The Australian Institute of Criminology (AIC), is an independent criminology research institute formed under the ACIC with the CEO of the ACIC also serving as the director of the ACI.

Australian Commission for Law Enforcement Integrity
The Australian Commission for Law Enforcement Integrity (ACLI) is a statutory agency with the purpose of investigating corruption and misconduct in Federal Law Enforcement agencies such as the Australian Federal Police, Australian Border Force, and in the Australian Criminal Intelligence Commission. ACLI cannot investigate state law enforcement or government employees who are not in a law enforcement agency. ACLI is likely to be replaced by a new National Anti-Corruption Commission which has the authority to investigate any commonwealth office holder or employee.

Military

Military Police, also known as Service Police, are the law enforcement branches of the services of a military tasked with enforcing and investigating offences violating military law. 

In Australia, each branch of the Australian Defence Force maintains its independent police force made up of military personnel from that service.  In the Australian Army, the Royal Australian Corps of Military Police conducts general law enforcement duties including security on military installations, investigations and close personal protection.  In the Royal Australian Navy, policing functions are undertaken by Coxswains.  In the Royal Australian Air Force, security and law enforcement duties are undertaken by Security Forces and Airfield Defence personnel.

Along with the independent service police forces is the Australian Defence Force Investigative Service (ADFIS), a special ADF unit made up of Investigators from each service's police and tasked with investigating more serious military offences.  All ADF policing agencies come under the umbrella of the Joint Military Police Unit (JMPU), an agency of the Australian Department of Defence led by the Provost Marshal and tasked with providing specialised military policing services and supporting civilian police in defence matters.

State/Territory

Each state, as well as the Northern Territory, is responsible for maintaining its police force which is responsible for policing at the state and local levels. This involves general law and order, forensics, traffic policing, major crime, anti-terrorism branches, water police, search and rescue and in some states transit police. Local policing in the Australian Capital Territory, Jervis Bay Territory and Australian external territories is contracted to the Australian Federal Police (AFP). Each state has a Department of Corrections which looks after the jails and prisoners.

In some states, local governments employ by-laws officers or rangers to enforce local by-laws or ordinances relating to such matters as parking, dog ownership, retailing, littering, or water usage. These local government officers are not considered to be police forces as they generally only have the power to issue fines and do not have the same powers as state police. They may rely upon appointment as a special constable or legislated powers for their authority.

Police 

State police also perform certain functions on behalf of the Australian government such as the enforcement of various Commonwealth Acts and regulations in conjunction with the Australian Federal Police and other Commonwealth officers.

The Australian Capital Territory (ACT) and Jervis Bay Territory are serviced by the  Australian Federal Police (AFP) ACT Policing.  The AFP also provide local policing the Australian external territories. 

While ACT Policing is under the jurisdiction of the Australian Federal Police, the following policing agencies are regulated by their respective state or territory government and are highly visible:

Sheriffs
In recent years, the states and territories have returned the responsibility of recovering court-ordered fines to their sheriffs. In practice, the police often carry out the functions of sheriffs and bailiffs in rural and more sparsely populated areas of Australia.

The office of sheriff was first established in Australia in 1824. This was simultaneous with the appointment of the first Chief Justice of New South Wales. The role of the sheriff has not been static, nor is it identical in each Australian state. In the past, a sheriff's duties included: executing court judgments, acting as a coroner, transporting prisoners, managing the jails, and carrying out executions (through the employment of an anonymous hangman).

Currently, no Australian state provides for capital punishment. A government department (usually called the Department of Corrections or similar) now runs the prison system and the coroner's office handles coronal matters. In most states, the sheriff is now largely responsible for enforcing the civil orders and fines of the court by seizing and selling the property of judgment debtors who do not satisfy the debt, providing court security, enforcing arrest warrants, evictions, taking juveniles into custody, and running the jury system. In some states the duties of the Sheriff also extends to courtroom security. Some state sheriffs can also apply a wide range of sanctions ranging from suspending driver's licenses and car registration through to wheel clamping and arranging community service orders, and as a last resort can make arrests.

Fisheries

In addition to the Australian Fisheries Management Authority, each state and the Northern Territory have Fisheries officers authorised to enforce State and Federal fisheries laws within their state's jurisdiction. The powers of these fisheries officers vary from State to State but generally, these officers have the power to board vessels, search vehicles, vessels, and persons and conduct arrests all in relation to fisheries laws. In some States, such as New South Wales, fisheries officers are authorised to carry personal defense equipment like their Federal counterparts.

Local

Council rangers are officers employed by local government areas in Australia to enforce the by-laws (local laws in Western Australia); of those local governments and a limited range of state laws relating to such matters as litter control, animal control, dog laws, fire control, off-road vehicles, emergency management, and parking. Unless they are also sworn in as special constables, as many are, rangers do not have full police powers. Council rangers are also referred to as local laws officers in some of Australia's eastern states. Most Council rangers have the power to issue fines that don't exceed a certain amount.

Advisory bodies and community groups

The Australia New Zealand Policing Advisory Agency (ANZPAA) was established in October 2007. ANZPAA is a joint initiative of the Australian and New Zealand Police Commissioners and is funded by contributions to Australia and New Zealand Police jurisdictions. ANZPAA is a non-operational policing agency that provides strategy and policy advice, and secretarial services to the ANZPAA Board on cross-jurisdictional policing initiatives that help enhance community safety and security. ANZPAA's strategic direction is set by ANZPAA’s board and the Australia New Zealand Council of Police Professionalisation (ANZCoPP, formerly Australasian Police Professional Standards Committee, APPSC).

The Australasian Police Professional Standards Committee (APPSC) was an organisation that served all police jurisdictions around Australia and New Zealand. It was the body for police education and training in Australia and New Zealand; the council comprising each of the police commissioners from Australia and New Zealand along with the president of the Police Federation of Australia and the president of the New Zealand Police Association. On 9 November 2007, APPSC roles and functions were amalgamated into ANZPAA. In 2013, APPSC was retitled to the Australia New Zealand Council of Police Professionalisation.

Crime Stoppers programs run in each state and on a national level. These programs collect information about crimes and pass them on to police, ensuring that the community can participate in fighting crime.

Controversies

Colonial legacy 

Involvement of state law enforcement in suppressing Indigenous resistance to colonisation has been widely controversial. The New South Wales Mounted Police were formed following the Bathurst War between British colonists and the Wiradjuri people in 1824, and in modern Australia continue to be deployed as part of police presence at peaceful protests in many states.

Across colonial Australia, police forces were mobilised in violent conflict during the Australian frontier wars and were heavily involved in the many Indigenous fatalities that led to sharp decline of Indigenous populations since colonisation. The Queensland Native Police Force alone were responsible for an estimated 24,000 "violent Aboriginal deaths" between 1859 and 1897, as calculated by professor Raymond Evans in 2009.

Slavery in Australia was sanctioned by law (before being banned in 1901 following Federation) and was officially upheld by many police forces and government systems. In the Northern Territory, the Aboriginals Ordinance 1918 (Cth) allowed forced recruitment of Indigenous people and legal non-payment of wages, granting Protectors and police the right to uphold this arrangement.

Transportation

By agreement between the various commissioners, most police cars in Australia are predominantly white, with a blue and white Sillitoe tartan checkered strip on the side. Historically, police fleets were comprised predominantly of domestically built models such as the Holden Commodore and Ford Falcon. With the demise of Holden and Ford production in Australia, fleets have grown to include models such as the Chrysler 300, BMW 5 Series, Kia Stinger, Volkswagen Passat, Mercedes-Benz E-Class and Hyundai Sonata. Prisoner transport vehicles are based on light commercial vehicles such as the Ford Ranger, Toyota Hilux, Holden Colorado, Mercedes Vito or Volkswagen Transporter.

A wide range of vehicles are used for unmarked purposes to blend in with civilian vehicles.
Emergency lights on police vehicles are now generally blue and red; historically though, blue lights were used for police vehicles and red lights for fire engines and ambulances. Council Ranger vehicles are usually fitted with either magenta or orange colored lights.

Most Australian police services have mounted police units that are prominently used for ceremonial purposes, although in New South Wales, South Australia, Western Australia and Victoria the mounted police also undertake operational policing duties.

See also

 Punishment in Australia
 Australian court hierarchy
 List of Australian prisons
 Immigration detention in Australia
 Crime in Australia
 Reasonable and probable grounds in Australia
 Terrorism in Australia

Notes

References

 
Australian criminal law
Crime in Australia
Public policy in Australia